The 1991–92 League of Ireland Premier Division was the seventh season of the League of Ireland Premier Division. The Premier Division was made up of 12 teams.

Overview
The Premier Division was contested by 12 teams and Shelbourne F.C. won the championship.

Final Table

Results

Matches 1–22

Matches 23–33

See also
 1991–92 League of Ireland First Division

References

Ireland
1991–92 in Republic of Ireland association football
League of Ireland Premier Division seasons